Middleton-on-Leven is a hamlet and civil parish in the Hambleton District of North Yorkshire, England. At the 2011 Census, the population was less than 100, and was recorded with the civil parish of Rudby. In the 2001 census, the parish had a population of 97.

Geography

It is situated next to the River Leven, near the villages of Hilton (north), Seamer (east) Hutton Rudby (south). Half a mile to the north-west at Castle Hill is the surviving motte of Castle Levington near the corresponding village.

References

External links

Villages in North Yorkshire
Civil parishes in North Yorkshire
Hambleton District